Kourosh Sehati (کوروش صحتی in Persian) (born April 7, 1978, in Tehran, Iran), is a journalist, one of the well-known human rights activists and former leaders of the students’ movement in Iran.

Sehati was expelled from the Islamic Azad University of Varamin because of his political activities and help in the organization of the July 1999 student pro-democracy protests against the Iranian government.

Arrests

He was arrested several times between 2000 and 2004 and spent around three years in the prisons. While being in Sepah prison that belongs to the Revolutionary Guards of Iran, Sehati spent eight months in the solitary cell. As a prisoner of conscience, he experienced tortures. Because of his activities focused on support of the democratic movements, freedom of speech and human rights in Iran, the authorities of Iran threatened his family members several times. The government was also behind the banishment of Gozaresh-e-Rooz newspaper and Hoviat-e-Kheesh weekly magazine, where he worked as a political editor and the member of editorial board.

After several arrests and detention terms, he decided to proceed with his media and human rights activists from abroad for safety reasons. Sehati fled to Turkey in 2004 and then was accepted by United Nations High Commissioner for Refugees as a political refugee.

Sehati has lived in the United States for more than twelve years and during that time has been interviewed by many TV channels and radio stations about his activities in Iran and on the topic of current Iranian issues.

Work

Kourosh Sehati worked for the Persian service of Voice of America based in Washington, D.C. as an international broadcaster, anchor, and producer from 2007 until August 2016. He currently works for the Iran International TV in London, UK.

Expertise
His reports are usually focused on political issues inside Iran, as well as, on the human rights issues, democratic movements in particular on students, workers, and women movements in the country.

References 
Witness Statement: Kourosh Sehati
IHRDC Interview With Kourosh Sehati
Boroumand Center - Sehati's interview about the experience in prison
Kourosh Sehati's interview with Ahmed Shaheed, United Nations Special Rapporteur on the situation of human rights in the Islamic Republic of Iran
Your Fatwa Does Not Apply Here: Untold Stories from the Fight Against Muslim Fundamentalism
Persian tv weekly highlights
Prominent Iranian Activist Given Long Prison Term, Lashes

Iranian dissidents
Iranian human rights activists
Iranian journalists
Living people
1978 births
People from Tehran